South Hyco Creek is a  long 4th order tributary to the Hyco River in Person County, North Carolina.  South Hyco Creek joins the Hyco River within Hyco Lake.  South Hyco Creek forms the Hyco River along with Hyco Creek.

Variant names
According to the Geographic Names Information System, it has also been known historically as:
Sugartree Creek
Sugar Tree Creek

Course
South Hyco Creek rises about 2.5 miles southeast of Prospect Hill, North Carolina and then flows north-northeast to join the Hyco River about 3 miles east-southeast of Semora, North Carolina.

Watershed
South Hyco Creek drains  of area, receives about 46.5 in/year of precipitation, has a wetness index of 400.00, and is about 54% forested.

References

Rivers of North Carolina
Rivers of Caswell County, North Carolina
Rivers of Orange County, North Carolina
Rivers of Person County, North Carolina
Tributaries of the Roanoke River